The Strauss House is a historic house at 528 East Page Street in Malvern, Arkansas.  It is a -story wood-frame structure, with a side gable roof, clapboard siding, and a brick foundation.  Its front facade has a wide shed-roof dormer with extended eaves in the roof, and a recessed porch supported by Tuscan columns.  Built in 1919, it was designed by the Arkansas firm of Thompson and Harding, and is a fine local variant of the Dutch Colonial Revival style.

The house was listed on the National Register of Historic Places in 1982.

See also
National Register of Historic Places listings in Hot Spring County, Arkansas
This house was built for Adalbert Strauss, president of Malvern Lumber Company in Perla, Arkansas.

References

Houses on the National Register of Historic Places in Arkansas
Colonial Revival architecture in Arkansas
Houses completed in 1919
Houses in Hot Spring County, Arkansas
National Register of Historic Places in Hot Spring County, Arkansas
Buildings and structures in Malvern, Arkansas
1919 establishments in Arkansas
Dutch Colonial Revival architecture in the United States